The Newport 41S is an American sailboat that was designed by C&C Design specifically as an International Offshore Rule racer-cruiser and first built in 1974. It was later developed into a series of Newport 41 family designs.

Production
The design was built by Capital Yachts in Harbor City, California, United States, starting in 1974, but it is now out of production.

Design
The Newport 41S is a racing keelboat, built predominantly of fiberglass, with wood trim. It has a masthead sloop rig; a raked stem; a raised counter, angled transom; an internally mounted spade-type rudder controlled by a wheel] and a fixed, swept, fin keel. It displaces  and carries  of ballast.

The design has sleeping accommodation for eight people, with a double "V"-berth in the bow cabin, an "L"-shaped settee around a drop-down table and double straight settee in the main cabin and an aft cabin with a double berth on the starboard side. The galley is located on the port side just forward of the companionway ladder. The galley is "U"-shaped and is equipped with a three-burner stove, an ice box and a sink. A navigation station is opposite the galley, on the starboard side. The head is located just aft of the bow cabin on the port side.

For sailing downwind the design may be equipped with a symmetrical spinnaker.

Operational history
In a 1994 review Richard Sherwood wrote, "perhaps the most unusual aspect of the Newport 41[S model] is the clutter of winches around the mast, all located on the cabin roof. There are five winches that almost complete a circle. These are all for halyards and vangs. All sheeting leads to the cockpit. There are two winches on the coach roof and two primary and two secondary winches at normal locations in the cockpit."

See also
List of sailing boat types

References

Keelboats
1970s sailboat type designs
Sailing yachts
Sailboat type designs by C&C Design
Sailboat types built by Capital Yachts